David Price Powers (December 2, 1932 – July 3, 2008) was an American television director and producer.

Life and career
Powers was born in Big Bear Lake, California, and broke into show business working as an usher on The Dinah Shore Show, 1966. He later worked as an associate director before being hired by Carol Burnett in 1968 to direct her variety program, CBS-TV's The Carol Burnett Show. He remained with the show through its entire ten-year run and also directed Burnett in a number of prime-time specials. Powers then went on to direct many episodes of the successful television programs Mama's Family and Three's Company (both from Season 3 up to and including their series finales), as well as of the Three's Company spinoffs The Ropers (Season 1) and Three's a Crowd (its entire lone season). Powers won four Emmys (1974,1975,1977, and 1978) for directing, and received three additional nominations, and was also nominated twice for Directors Guild of America awards. Powers, who became a member of the Directors Guild of America in 1956, remained a member for 52 years. In addition to her variety series, Powers directed Burnett in two CBS-TV specials, Sills and Burnett at the Met, with Beverly Sills, for which he was nominated for another Emmy, as well as Julie and Carol at Lincoln Center, with Julie Andrews.

Powers's daughter Debra Lee Vowell (born October 27, 1957) disappeared in January 1979 while on a boating trip off the California coast.

Powers died July 3, 2008 in Palm Desert, California of skin cancer.

References

External links

LA Times Obituary

1933 births
2008 deaths
People from Big Bear Lake, California
American television directors
Television producers from California
Deaths from cancer in California
Deaths from skin cancer